Al Mansour is a sub-district located in Nati' District, Al Bayda Governorate, Yemen.  Al Mansour had a population of 1066 according to the 2004 census.

References 

Sub-districts in Nati' District